Daniel J. Myers (born April 9, 1966, in Xenia, Ohio) is the President of Misericordia University in Dallas, Pennsylvania and a professor of Sociology. His best known research is on the urban unrest of the 1960s and the media coverage of those riots, specializing in identifying the patterns of unrest diffusion. He has written several books and articles, and is co-author of the best-selling sociological social psychology textbook, Social Psychology.

Early life and education
Daniel Myers was born in Xenia, Ohio, a town of approximately 20,000. His father was a Baptist minister. Myers moved throughout the United States during his childhood, including to New York, Pittsburgh, Indiana, Ohio, and West Virginia. Myers graduated from high school in Zanesville, and then graduated from The Ohio State University in Columbus, Ohio, in 1988 with a B.A. in political science and in 1991 with a M.A. in higher education and student affairs. In 1995, Myers graduated from the University of Wisconsin, Madison with a M.S. in sociology, followed by a Ph.D. in sociology in 1997. He wrote his dissertation on 'Diffusion Models for Riots and Other Collective Violence'.

Research areas
Myers' principal research interests are collective behavior and social movements. His most recent work focuses on racial rioting in the 1960s and 1970s, deterministic and stochastic models of diffusion for collective violence, mathematical models of collective action, media coverage of protests, demonstrations, and riots, and game theoretic analyses of small group negotiation.

Former positions
Myers as Provost and Chief Academic Officer at American University in Washington, D.C., Provost and Executive Vice President of Academic Affairs at Marquette University in Milwaukee, WI. Before that he held a number of positions at the University of Notre Dame including Vice President and Associate Provost, Professor of Sociology, and Director of Research and Faculty Development at the Kroc Institute for International Peace Studies. He founded the Center for the Study of Social Movements and served as editor of Mobilization: The International Quarterly Review of Social Movement Research.  Myers also served as a Senior Fellow for the Phelps-Stokes Fund in Washington, D.C., was vice-president of the Board of the South Bend Symphony Orchestra, and was President of Board of the Good Shepherd Montessori School (South Bend, Indiana).

Honors and awards
Dr. Myers has received the following honors and awards:
 Sheedy Teaching Award from the Notre Dame College of Arts and Letters in 2007.
 Best Published Article from the American Sociological Association Section on Collective Behavior and Social Movements in 2005, co-authored with Beth Schaefer Caniglia.
 Elected to Alpha Kappa Delta in 2004.
 Kaneb Teaching Award for Excellence in Undergraduate Teaching from the University of Notre Dame in 2002.
 Katherine DuPre Lumpkin Dissertation Award for Outstanding Dissertation in Sociology from the University of Wisconsin, Madison in 1998.
 Genevieve Gorst Herfurth Award for the best paper written by a graduate student in the social sciences from the University of Wisconsin, Madison in 1996.
 Runner-up for the Graduate Student Paper Competition from the American Sociological Association Section on Collective Behavior and Social Movements in 1995.
 Teaching Leadership Award from The Pew Charitable Trusts in 1993.

References

External links
 Notre Dame Arts and Letters faculty bio
 Center for the Study of Social Movements
 Joan B. Kroc Institute for International Peace Studies
 Conant Associates
 Mobilization (journal)
 Phelps Stokes Fund
 Curriculum Vitæ 

American sociologists
People from Xenia, Ohio
University of Wisconsin–Madison College of Letters and Science alumni
Ohio State University College of Arts and Sciences alumni
1966 births
Living people
University of Notre Dame faculty
American University faculty and staff
Ohio State University College of Education and Human Ecology alumni